The House of Buttlar (also Butler, Buttler or Treusch von Buttlar) is the name of an old Upper Franconian-Hessian noble family. The lords of Buttlar originate from the ancient nobility (German: uradel) of Buchonia. Branches of the family also reached Westphalia, Saxony, Prussia, Curonia, France, Poland, Russia and Hungary, and remain partly to this day. The Buttlar and Treusch von Buttlar families of Hessen has since 1660 belonged to the Old Hessian Knighthood, the oldest foundation in Hessen.

Known family members 

 Adrian von Buttlar (1948—), German art historian (de)
 Alfred von Buttlar-Moscon (1898–1972), Austrian writer, poet and translator (de)
 Augusta von Buttlar (1793–1866), German portrait and miniature painter (de)
 Carl-Hubertus von Butler (1950—), Lieutenant General of the Bundeswehr (de)
 Edgar von Buttlar (1889–1955), German Major general
 Egon Freiherr von Buttlar (1899–1987), conductor, entertainer and pianist
 Eva von Buttlar (1670–1721), German mystic (de)
 Franz Adolph von Buttlar (1727–1803), Geheimer Rat for the Electorate of Mainz, Electorate of Trier and Princely-Fulda, Knight of the Order of the Golden Lion
 Georg von Buttlar der Ältere (1408–1489), court servant for landgrave Louis I of Hesse, acquired the Lordship of Ziegenberg in 1451 as Pfandschaft
 Georg von Buttlar der Jüngere, bought the Lordship of Ziegenberg in 1494 and received it as a hereditary fief
 Georg Daniel von Buttlar (1671–1725), Knight of the Teutonic Order (de)
 Gerda Freifrau Treusch von Buttlar-Brandenfels (1894–1975), German writer (de)
 Hans Heinrich Treusch von Buttlar, Honourable member of the Fruitbearing Society
 Haro von Buttlar (—2000), German physicist
 Herbert von Buttlar (1912–1976), German classical archeologist and manager of science (de)
 Horst Freiherr Treusch von Buttlar-Brandenfels (1900–1990), German Major general
 Horst Julius Freiherr Treusch von Buttlar-Brandenfels (1885–1962), German airship commander
 Horst von Buttlar (1975—), German journalist (de)
 Johann Anton Franz von Buttlar (1685–1731), Upper Rhineian, Prussian and Imperial Major general (de)
 Johannes von Buttlar (1940—), author of popular science literature (de)
 Johann Christoph von Buttlar († 1705), Major general (de)
 Julius Adolf Friedrich Treusch von Buttlar (1716–1784), Major general (de)
 Konstantin von Buttlar (1679–1726), Prince Abbot of Fulda (de)
 Ludwig Treusch von Buttlar-Brandenfels (1804–1872), Lieutenant General
 Ludwig von Buttlar (1850–1928), Landrat (de)
 Peter von Butler (1913–2010), Lieutenant General of the Bundeswehr (de)
 Peter von Butler (diplomat) (1940–2014), German diplomat (de)
 Robert Treusch von Buttlar-Brandenfels, German spy who repeatedly switched sides between 1936 and 1945, and who gained fame through the process of the Bad Nenndorf interrogation centre.
 Rudolf von Buttlar (1802–1875), German forester, inventor and politician (de)
 Ruprecht von Butler (1924—), Major general of the Bundeswehr (de)
 Ruprecht Horst von Butler (1967—), Brigadier general of the Bundeswehr (de)
 Walter Treusch von Buttlar-Brandenfels (1865–1954), Major general
 Wilhelm Treusch von Buttlar-Brandenfels (1814–1889), Major general
 Wolfgang Treusch von Buttlar-Brandenfels (1861–1928), Lieutenant general

Literature
 Ernst Heinrich Kneschke: Neues allgemeines deutsches Adels-Lexicon. Vol. 3, Friedrich Voigt's Buchhandlung, Leipzig 1861, pp. 180–182. (Digitalisat)
 
 Leopold von Zedlitz-Neukirch: Neues preussisches Adelslexicon. Vol. 2, Gebrüder Reichenbach, Leipzig 1836, pp. 442–444. (Digitalisat)
 Ludwig von Buttlar: Das Werden unseres Geschlechts, Vacha (Rhön) 1925, [2. Aufl.]
 Genealogisches Handbuch des in Bayern immatrikulierten Adels,  hrsg. von der Vereinigung des Adels in Bayern, Vol. 11, pp. 519–522.
 Genealogisches Handbuch des Adels, Adelslexikon Vol. II, Vol. 58 der Gesamtreihe, C. A. Starke Verlag, Limburg (Lahn) 1974,

External links 
 Familie von Buttlar auf Elberberg
 Wappen Treusch von Buttlar im Sammelband mehrerer Wappenbücher, Süddeutschland (Augsburg ?) um 1530
 „Butlar“ im Wappenbuch des Heiligen Römischen Reiches, Nürnberg um 1554–1568

German noble families
Hessian nobility
Franconian nobility
Baltic nobility
Rhön Mountains